The Carthage United Methodist Church is a historic church in Carthage, Tennessee, USA.

Location
The church is located at 609 Main Street in Carthage, a small town in Smith County, Tennessee, United States.

History
The church building was completed in 1889. It was designed in the Gothic Revival architectural style. It was built for the Carthage United Methodist Church congregation as its fourth church building.  The congregation was established in 1808.

Architectural significance
It has been listed on the National Register of Historic Places since July 5, 1985, as a significant example of  Gothic Revival Church architecture in Carthage.  The church includes a bell town and stained glass lancet windows.

References

Gothic Revival architecture in Tennessee
Churches on the National Register of Historic Places in Tennessee
United Methodist churches in Tennessee
Churches completed in 1889
National Register of Historic Places in Smith County, Tennessee